WDEK (1170 AM) is a daytimer radio station licensed to Lexington, South Carolina, and serving the Columbia metropolitan area.  It is owned by The Meeting Place Church of Greater Columbia and it airs a gospel music radio format.

By day, WDEK is powered at 10,000 watts, using a non-directional antenna.  But because AM 1170 is a clear channel frequency, WDEK must sign off at sunset to avoid interference.  During critical hours, the station is powered at 3,300 watts.  Programming can be heard around the clock on FM translator W239DA at 95.7 MHz.

History
1170 signed on as WXAX in late 1983 with a country music format. The station became WLGO in 1988 with an automated adult contemporary format. This lasted until the early 1990s, when the station went to a religious format.

In 2005, the station was sold and the format was changed to Spanish Contemporary under the "Radio Ritmo" handle. The new call letters became WQVA.

The station was owned by Peregon Communications, which in 2008 simulcast "Radio Ritmo" on WIGL/St. Matthews (under a LMA).

In November 2010, the station was in receivership with a request to transfer the license to Broomfield Broadcasting of Greenwood, SC.  Broomfield also owns radio station WCZZ.  Under Broomfield ownership, the station changed its call sign to WDEK, calling itself "1170 The Deck".

WDEK's previous format was urban oldies as "Jammin' Hits 97.9 & 1170", adding FM translator W250CG at 97.9 MHz.

Effective May 10, 2021, Bloomfield Broadcasting sold WDEK and W250CG to The Meeting Place Church of Greater Columbia for $475,000.

External links

DEK
Gospel radio stations in the United States
DEK